The following radio stations broadcast on AM frequency 1701 kHz:

In Australia 
 Radio Brisvaani in Brisbane, Queensland.
 Islamic Voice Radio in Melbourne, Victoria.
 Voice of Charity in Sydney, New South Wales.

References

Lists of radio stations by frequency